The 2016 UCI Women's World Tour was the first edition of the UCI Women's World Tour. It featured nine one-day races of the former UCI Women's Road World Cup, plus another four one-day races. However, unlike its predecessor, the World Tour also incorporated four stage races, in China, the United States, the United Kingdom and Italy respectively.

The individual classification was won by American rider Megan Guarnier, riding for the  team. Guarnier took the lead of the standings after winning the Tour of California, maintaining it for the remainder of the year, adding further race victories at the Philadelphia Cycling Classic, and the Giro d'Italia Femminile. Her closest competitor, Canada's Leah Kirchmann finished over 300 points in arrears in second place. Armitstead took four victories – the most by any rider in 2016 – including a win in her home race, the Women's Tour.

In the other classifications,  rider Katarzyna Niewiadoma from Poland was the winner of the youth classification for riders under the age of 23.

Events

Final points standings

Individual

Riders tied with the same number of points were classified by number of victories, then number of second places, third places, and so on, in World Tour events and stages.

Youth

The top three riders in the final results of each World Tour event's young rider classification received points towards the standings. Six points were awarded to first place, four points to second place and two points to third place.

Team

Team rankings were calculated by adding the ranking points of the top four riders of a team in each race, plus points gained in the Crescent Vårgårda UCI Women's WorldTour TTT.

References

 
2016 in women's road cycling
UCI Women's World Tour